The San Cassiano Altarpiece is a painting by the Italian Renaissance master Antonello da Messina, dating to 1475–1476. Commissioned for the church of San Cassiano in Venice, it was disassembled in the early 17th-century and the reunited central portion is now housed in the Kunsthistorisches Museum in Vienna. It was one of the most influential paintings in the Veneto area of the time.

History
It is unknown when it was disassembled or why, but it was already in fragments when parts of it were documented by David Teniers the Younger for his Theatrum Pictorium in 1660. It wasn't until 1929 that three of the fragments were reunited by the Hungarian art historian Johannes Wilde. Other surviving fragments have been analysed to fit according to the model of a reconstruction in a virtual architectural study. Originally a larger altarpiece, it now comprises only the central panel with the Virgin Enthroned, and four half-busts of saints: St. Nicholas of Bari, Mary Magdalene (or Ursula), St. Lucy and St. Dominic.

Allegedly inspired by another Holy Conversation by Giovanni Bellini in the church of San Giovanni e Paolo (now known only through copies), it features however a more balance composition and a more sober architecture. Antonello adopted a pyramidal layout, enhanced by the accurate use of  light.

The book with three golden balls held by St. Nicholas alludes to the episode in which he gave them to three girls to be used as dowry.

See also
Italian Renaissance painting, development of themes

References

  J. Wilde, "Pala di San Cassiano" Rekonstruktionsversuch, Jahrbuch der Kunsthist. Samml. in Wien, n. s., III (1929), pp. 57-72

Sources
 
scopamici

External links
Page at the museum's website 
Antonello da Messina: Sicily's Renaissance Master, a full text exhibition catalog from The Metropolitan Museum of Art, which contains material on the altarpiece

1470s paintings
Paintings by Antonello da Messina
Paintings of the Madonna and Child
Paintings in the collection of the Kunsthistorisches Museum
Paintings depicting Mary Magdalene
Altarpieces
Paintings of Saint Ursula
Paintings of Saint Lucy
Paintings of Saint Nicholas
Paintings of Saint Dominic
Books in art